Dyscheralcis is a genus of moths in the family Geometridae. The genus was erected by Louis Beethoven Prout in 1916.

Species
Dyscheralcis retroflexa L. B. Prout, 1916
Dyscheralcis crimnodes Turner, 1917

References

Ennominae